The Horse Memorial is a provincial heritage site in Port Elizabeth in the Eastern Cape province of South Africa, in memory of the horses that served and died during the Second Boer War, where Britain brought a large number of horses to South Africa. Designed by Joseph Whitehead, the life-sized bronze memorial features a kneeling soldier presenting a bucket of water to a service horse.

History

More than 300,000 horses died in British service in South Africa.

One of the principal reasons for Port Elizabeth taking such an interest in the movement, which started in 1901, was the fact that most of the horses brought to this country were landed there. The horses were shipped from all over the world, including 50,000 from the United States and 35,000 from Australia.

A ladies committee was formed with Mrs Harriet Meyer as president and £800 was collected for Messrs Whitehead and Sons, of Kennington and Westminster, to erect the statue. The statue was originally located close to the junction of Park Drive and Rink Street, next to St George's Park, but was moved to its present position in Cape Road in the 1950s. The Mayor said in his unveiling speech:

Design

The horse stands , and the figure of the soldier is life size. In addition to the memorial proper, there is a drinking trough for horses and cattle, and the wants of the thirsty wayfarer are also provided for. The design as a whole is an object lesson in kindness, and may appeal to the cruel or careless driver, and teach him that there are some who do not think it beneath them to attend to the wants of animals placed under their charge.

The memorial was described in the Government Gazette asThe inscription on the base reads:

Vandalism 
On 6 April 2015, the memorial was vandalised by a group of men associated with the far left Economic Freedom Fighters. The monument was one of a number of colonial era statues and memorials vandalised after the spread of the Rhodes Must Fall campaign, in March 2015, which aimed to move a statue of Cecil John Rhodes from the University of Cape Town.

See also 
 Horses in the Second Boer War
 Horses in warfare
 Cavalry
 Joseph Whitehead

References

External links

Horses in the Boer War

Monuments and memorials in South Africa
Buildings and structures in Port Elizabeth
Second Boer War memorials
Warhorses
South African heritage sites
Vandalized works of art